Glennies Creek Dam is a minor ungated concrete faced curved earth and rockfill embankment dam with an uncontrolled rock cut spillway across the Glennies Creek, upstream of Singleton, in the Hunter region of New South Wales, Australia. The dam's purpose includes flood mitigation, irrigation, water supply and conservation. The impounded reservoir is called Lake Saint Clair.

The Act appropriated AU$30 million as the estimated cost of construction of the dam.

Location and features
The dam was built by Citra Constructions Limited on behalf of the NSW Department of Land and Water Conservation and the NSW Department of Water Resources to supply water for the town of Singleton, as well as irrigation, flood mitigation, and for coal mining.

The uncontrolled rockcut spillway is capable of discharging . Glennies Creek Dam is operated in conjunction with Glenbawn Dam. The two dams supply water requirements along  of the Hunter River from Glenbawn to the tidal reaches near Maitland.

Glennies Creek Dam spillway is an unlined cutting in welded ash flow tuff which supplied the entire rock fill requirement for the construction of the dam embankment. The spillway excavation was designed to be located entirely in welded tuff and not to encroach on either the underlying non-welded tuff or the overlying sandstone, both of these rock types being much inferior to the welded tuff as a rock fill construction material.

The Glennies Creek and the Glennies Creek Dam are both named after James Glennie, a former naval captain who was granted creek frontage land near the Hunter River junction in 1824.

Recreation
The dam is a popular location for swimming, boating, sailing, water skiing and fishing.

See also

 Irrigation in Australia
 List of dams and reservoirs in Australia

References

External links
 
 

Concrete-face rock-fill dams
Dams completed in 1983
Dams in New South Wales
Hunter Region
Embankment dams